This article lists events that occurred during 1958 in Estonia.

Incumbents

Events
1st Moonsund Regatta took place.

Births
9 August – Arvo Kukumägi, actor (d. 2017)

Deaths

References

 
1950s in Estonia
Estonia
Estonia
Years of the 20th century in Estonia